NGC 2071 is a reflection nebula in the constellation Orion.  It was discovered on January 1, 1784, by William Herschel. It is part of a group of nebulae that also includes Messier 78, NGC 2064, and NGC 2067.

References

External links 
 
 The Interactive NGC Catalog Online: NGC 2170
 NASA/IPAC Extragalactic Database: NGC 2071

Reflection nebulae
Orion molecular cloud complex
Orion (constellation)
2071